The March of Fools is a 1975 South Korean comedy film directed by Ha Gil-jong.

Plot
Philosophy university students, Byeong-tae and Yeong-cheol, make friends with French Literature female students, Yeong-ja and Sun-ja, from a nearby university. They often hang out, sharing their troubles and drinking together. They talk about their dreams for the future but the future is bleak.

Cast
 Yun Mun-seop as Byeong-tae
 Ha Jae-young as Yeong-cheol
 Lee Young-ok as Yeong-ja
 Kim Yeong-suk as Sun-ja
 Hah Myung-joong
 Park Am

References

External links
 
 
 

1975 films
1970s Korean-language films
South Korean comedy films